The Shalkani is a village in northern Khyber Pakhtunkhwa, northwestern Pakistan. Shalkani is located approximately at 6 km distance from Peshawar to Dir GT Road.

Location
Shalkani is located on the left side of Panjkoora River, about 26 kilometers from Timergara. To the north side of Shalkani Jelar Dara is located, to the south is Shalpalam, to the east is Akhagram and to the west is Luqman Banda, and Shalkani is located as a small valley in center of them.

Education
Following is the list of schools in Shalkani.

See also
 Timergara
 Dir
 Peshawar

References

Populated places in Malakand District